Yevheniy Pichkur (born 18 April 1985, in the Ukraine SSR of the Soviet Union)

Career
On 2009 he moved from Desna Chernihiv to Volyn Lutsk. In 2012 he moved to Vorskla Poltava In 2013 he moved to Oleksandriya in Ukrainian First League until 2014 where he played 28 matches and scored 2 goals. In 2014 he moved to Inhulets Petrove, where won the Ukrainian Amateur Cup in 2014

Honours
Inhulets Petrove
 Ukrainian Football Amateur League: 2014

Volyn Lutsk
 Ukrainian First League: 2013–14

Oleksandriya
 Ukrainian Second League: 2005–06
 Ukrainian First League: Runner-up 2013–14

References

External links
 footballfacts.ru
 Profile on Official website of Ukrainian Second League
 Yevheniy Pichkur soccerway.com

1979 births
Living people
Soviet footballers
Ukrainian footballers
Association football midfielders
FC Desna Chernihiv players
FC Kramatorsk players
FC Enerhiya Yuzhnoukrainsk players
FC Hirnyk Kryvyi Rih players
FC Kremin Kremenchuk players
FC Oleksandriya players
FC Krymteplytsia Molodizhne players
FC Volyn Lutsk players
FC Vorskla Poltava players
FC Helios Kharkiv players
FC Inhulets Petrove players
FC Bucha players
FC Kolos Kovalivka players